The Beverly Hills Cannabis Club was established by Cheryl Shuman in 1996. She reportedly created the business "to change public perception about marijuana and open the door for legalization".

See also
Cannabis in California
Cannabis in the United States

References

External links
 

1996 establishments in California
1996 in cannabis
American companies established in 1996
Cannabis companies of the United States
Cannabis in California